{{Infobox ethnic group
|group = Rotenese people|image    = 
|caption  = The two Rotine people wear elegantly woven straw hats, characteristic of the island, circa 1899-1900.
|poptime  = 
|popplace =  (Rote Island & West Timor)
|langs    = Rotenese languages, Indonesian language
|rels     = Christianity (predominantly), Folk religion, Islam
|related  = Atoni, Kemak people, Helong people
}}Rotenese people' are one of the native inhabitants of Rote Island, while part of them reside in Timor. Apart from that, the Rotenese people also settled in islands surrounding Rote Island, such as Ndao Island, Nuse Island, Pamana Island, Doo Island, Heliana Island, Landu Island, Manuk Island, and other smaller islands. There are some who believed that the Rotenese people originally migrated from Seram Island, Maluku. They were thought to have arrived on the Rote Island during the reign of the Majapahit kingdom in the late 13th-16th century. It was during this time that there were references to the rulers of the Rotenese people. Initially, the Rotenese people founded settlements on the island of Timor, where they engaged in manual slash-and-burn farming and used irrigation system.

Language
The Rotenese language is part of the Austronesian languages, from the Southwest Malayo-Polynesian languages, which are made up of several dialects. The main dialects are Lole (Loleh), Ringgou, Termanu, Bilba, Dengka, Dhao, Tii (Thie), Oenale and Dela (Delha).

Livelihood

The livelihood of the Rotenese people includes agriculture, animal farming, fishing, tapping Neera and palm crafting. Lands that are well irrigated is used as paddy field or water catchment. The main farming produce are rice, corn, cassava, sorghum, millet, as well as other commodities like pepper, peanuts, vegetables and coffee; while the main animal farming are buffaloes, cattle, horses and poultry. Rotenese women work on traditional weaving handicrafts, woven Pandan leaves, pottery and so on. Small trades are also common.

Diet
The most common diet of the Rotenese people are from tubers, porridge, and fish with spicy seasonings.

Social structure

The kinship system of this people are nucleus family kinship or broad family with patriarchalistic in character, and also maintains an exogamy clan marriage customs. The formation of large families consist of the smaller clans called nggi leo; which in turn the formation of these smaller clans make up of the larger clans called leo.

Religion
The traditional beliefs of the Rotenese people centers on a creator known as Lamatuan or Lamatuak. This deity that is regarded as a creator, predestinator and the one who blesses, is symbolized by a three-branched pillar. Today, most Rotenese people practices Protestantism Christianity, Catholicism Christianity or Islam.

Culture
Traditional Rotenese clothing is a kain (a cloth of up to 2.5 meters long, wrapped around the waist, reaching to the knees or ankles), as well as jackets and shirts, with a specific style of a straw hat called ti'i langga''. A typical family is small and based on patrilocal marriage; where the wife resides in the community of her husband.

References 

Ethnic groups in Indonesia